Gary is an industrial section located in the southeastern part of Tampa, Florida, mainly in the vicinity of Adamo Drive east of Downtown Tampa.

Geography
Gary is located at 27.955855 degrees north and 82.4281495 degrees west. The elevation of the area is 25 ft above sea level.

Gary has no official boundaries, however, the USGS has listed the area as a populated place. Other areas in Gary are Palmetto Beach and East Ybor.

History

Etymology

The name Gary was officially recognized with the establishment of the Gary post office in 1898. The official plat of "Gary-Town" was recorded in May 1903. The Gary neighborhood included both Gary-Town and Spanish Park, located to its east. The neighborhood's boundaries extended from 26th Street on the west to 40th Street on the east. The population included Anglos, Italians, Spaniards and Cubans. Celery farming played a prominent role in Gary. The neighborhood also included cigar factories, a citrus packing house, dairies, a blacksmith shop, churches, boarding houses and several retail establishments.

Logistics
Gary, located to the east of Ybor City just east of 30th Street, incorporated on Oct. 9, 1915. Its settlement goes back a dozen years earlier, when the Hendry & Knight Real Estate Co. subdivided the "Celebrated Neyland's Celery Farm Land" and put it up for sale in April 1903.
The company took out a full-page advertisement in the May 3, 1903, Tampa Tribune. The ad featured the legal plot of "Garytown" along with a glowing description of the potential for real estate investors. The ad was printed in three languages (English, Spanish and Italian), which shows the multicultural nature of Tampa and Ybor City at that time.
The original plot of Gary was fairly small. The Atlantic Coast Line railroad tracks just north of Sixth Avenue served as the southern boundary and 11th Avenue was the northern boundary, while 26th Street and 28th Street served as the western and eastern limits.
Those boundaries shifted to the east and grew considerably when Gary was incorporated. The new limits were (starting from the north): 21st Avenue (Wall Street) east to 37th Street and the Tampa Northern Railroad tracks, then south to Hillsborough Bay, west to 30th Street, then back north to 21st Avenue.
The City of Gary was incorporated in October 1915. The municipal boundaries stretched from 30th Street on the west to 37th Street on the east and Wall Street (21st Avenue) on the north to the bay on the south. The state legislature abolished the City of Gary in 1919. Then, in 1923, the City of Tampa extended its boundaries to encompass the former City of Gary.
After World War II, an African American population moved into Gary. In the 1960s, Interstate 4 cut through the neighborhood, destroying many homes. The Gary School was recognized by the City of Tampa as an historical landmark in 2005.

Railroads

Gary has an important wye that was once used for the Seaboard Air Line Railroad as a runaround and turning point for passenger trains such as the Silver Meteor and the Floridian to back into Tampa Union Station.  It was also used for trains to access the Clearwater subdivision to service stations in Clearwater, Pinellas Park and St Petersburg, Florida. In 1984, Amtrak discontinued its service to Clearwater.  Once a busy location of train activity, the area has been reduced to a few local freight trains each day.  Amtrak passenger trains still use the former SAL/ACL/SCL tracks and wye to turn around and back into Tampa Union Station.

Industrial Development
Gary started having industrial development by now nearly in Ybor City, Gary did have several cigar factories. The Tierra del Lago Cigar Co. was originally at 1908 N 36th St. and remained there until 1919. The cigar company then moved to the corner of 18th Street and Pansy Avenue (between 21st and 22nd Avenues), where it remained until late 1926. The building still stands on the corner of Ninth Avenue and 36th Street and is used by the True Love Missionary Baptist Church.

Large firms that would eventually call Ybor City home also operated in Gary. The Arguelles & Co. firm worked out of a building at Third Avenue and 31st Street; J.D. Greenless had a factory on Eighth Avenue between 36th and 37th Streets; and A. Ramirez & Co. operated a factory on 35th Street.

Growth in Gary was quick, and the need for government services was met almost as quickly. On July 27, 1904, trustees for the "new Gary school district" met and decided to build a school. It was to be a two-story 26- by 50-foot structure, projected to cost $600. The Gary School survived for 101 years, from 1910 to 2011, at 3610 10th Ave. before neglect and decay finally took their toll. Part of the roof and one wall collapsed, forcing the demolition of the rest of the structure.

Two news items from April 1909 showed that growth, and growing pains, were part of everyday life in Gary. Residents inside the city limits have agreed to remove fencing "while there are no crops in the ground" from the roadways, opening them up to travel. This move was backed by W.N. Jackson, a "well known real estate dealer and promoter of Gary and Palmetto Beach." While many places in Florida gave the right-of-way to livestock, Gary is unique in doing so for its cash crops.Tampa Bay Times

References

http://www.ghosttowns.com/states/fl/gary.html

External links
Ghost Towns: Gary

Neighborhoods in Tampa, Florida
Former census-designated places in Florida